The men's 400 metres hurdles competition at the 2012 Summer Olympics in London, United Kingdom took place on 3–6 August at the Olympic Stadium. There were 49 competitors from 33 nations. The event was won by Félix Sánchez of the Dominican Republic, the second victory in the men's long hurdles for both the man and the nation. Sánchez was the eighth man to win multiple medals in the event and fourth to win two golds. Michael Tinsley of the United States earned silver. Javier Culson's bronze was Puerto Rico's first medal in the event.

Background

This was the 25th time the event was held. It had been introduced along with the men's 200 metres hurdles in 1900, with the 200 being dropped after 1904 and the 400 being held through 1908 before being left off the 1912 programme. However, when the Olympics returned in 1920 after World War I, the men's 400 metres hurdles was back and would continue to be contested at every Games thereafter.

Four of the eight finalists from the 2008 Games returned: gold medalist (and 2000 gold medalist) Angelo Taylor of the United States, silver medalist Kerron Clement of the United States, fifth-place finisher L. J. van Zyl of South Africa, and eighth-place finisher Periklis Iakovakis of Greece. Also returning was 2004 gold medalist Félix Sánchez of the Dominican Republic, who had not advanced out of the quarterfinals in Beijing 2008. The American team had swept the medals four years earlier; Michael Tinsley won the 2012 U.S. trials to join Taylor and Clement (replacing 2008 bronze medalist Bershawn Jackson on the three-man team). Clement was World Champion in 2007 and 2009. The reigning (2011) world champion was Dai Greene of the host Great Britain. Javier Culson had finished second in both the 2009 and 2011 World Championships. He was a slight favorite among the impressive field.

Comoros, Estonia, Serbia, Togo, Trinidad and Tobago, and Uruguay each made their debut in the event. The United States made its 24th appearance, most of any nation, having missed only the boycotted 1980 Games.

Summary

In the qualifying round, local favorite Dai Greene ran the fastest ever opening round race in the third heat, only to see that mark passed by three athletes in the following heat, led by an eased up Javier Culson. The slowest time qualifier was Kenneth Medwood in 49.78, though Stanislav Melnykov managed to get into the semis automatically with a 50.13 in the slow fifth heat.

With only two automatic qualifiers going to the final from each heat, the first semifinal stacked three former World Champions into one race. Less than a month before his 35th birthday, Félix Sánchez, the 2001 and 2003 World Champion showed he was still in the game, running a season best 47.76. Jehue Gordon upset the form setting the Trinidad and Tobago national record 47.96 in second, leaving 2007 and 2009 World Champion Kerron Clement in 3rd and 2011 World Champion Dai Greene in 4th to hope to qualify on time. The second semi was dominated by world leader Javier Culson and defending champion Angelo Taylor. In the third semi, American trials champion Michael Tinsley and Leford Green separated from the rest of the field. After a nervous wait Clement and Greene made the final on time.

In the final, Taylor, Culson and Sanchez led the way, arriving at the 8th hurdle about even. Taylor took the hurdle awkwardly and started losing ground.  While Culson looked to struggle, Sanchez powered away down the stretch for the win, in exactly the same time as his 2004 victory. Tinsley came back from a couple steps back to pass Culson over the last hurdle for the silver, with Greene also trying to make a stretch run to finish fourth.

This was the second ever Olympic medal in Athletics, and the third gold medal overall for the Dominican Republic, the first being Sanchez' in 2004.

In repeating as Olympic champion non-consecutively, Sánchez joined a rare club including Paavo Nurmi, Volodymyr Holubnychy, Heike Drechsler, Nina Romashkova, Edwin Moses (caused by the boycott) and Angelo Taylor. Both Moses and Taylor were in this same event. Ulrike Meyfarth did it remarkably 12 years apart. Ezekiel Kemboi completed such a double the day before and Meseret Defar would complete one four days later.

Qualification

A National Olympic Committee (NOC) could enter up to 3 qualified athletes in the men's 400 metres  hurdles event if all athletes met the A standard, or 1 athlete if they met the B standard. The maximum number of athletes per nation had been set at 3 since the 1930 Olympic Congress. The qualifying time standards could be obtained in various meets during the qualifying period that had the approval of the IAAF. Both outdoor meets and indoor meets were eligible. The A standard for the 2012 men's 400 metres hurdles was 49.50 seconds; the B standard was 49.80 seconds. The qualifying period for was from 1 May 2011 to 8 July 2012. NOCs could also have an athlete enter the 400 metres hurdles through a universality place. NOCs could enter one male athlete in an athletics event, regardless of time, if they had no male athletes meeting the qualifying A or B standards in any men's athletic event.

Competition format

The men's 400 metres hurdles competition consisted of quarterfinals, semifinals, and a final. The fastest competitors from each race in the heats qualified for the semifinals along with the fastest overall competitors not already qualified that were required to fill the available spaces in the semifinals. 24 competitors qualified from the heats for the semifinals. There were three semifinals, with the top two runners in each along with the next two fastest overall qualifying for the eight-man final.

Records

, the existing world and Olympic records were as follows.

The following national records were set during this competition.

Schedule

All times are British Summer Time (UTC+1)

Results

Quarterfinals

Qual. rule: first 3 of each heat (Q) plus the 6 fastest times (q) qualified.

Quarterfinal 1

Quarterfinal 2

Quarterfinal 3

Quarterfinal 4

Quarterfinal 5

Quarterfinal 6

Semifinals

Qual. rule: first 2 of each heat (Q) plus the 2 fastest times (q) qualified.

Semifinal 1

Semifinal 2

Semifinal 3

Final

Results summary

References

Athletics at the 2012 Summer Olympics
400 metres hurdles at the Olympics
Men's events at the 2012 Summer Olympics